The women's 63 kg Judo competitions at the 2014 Commonwealth Games in Glasgow, Scotland was held on 25 July at the Scottish Exhibition and Conference Centre. Judo returned to the program, after last being competed back in 2002.

Results

Repechages

Preliminaries

References

W63
2014
Commonwealth 63